Voiceworks can refer to one of the following:

 VoiceWorks (choir) - an ensemble of the Queensland Youth Choir.
 Voiceworks (journal) - an Australian journal